The first season of American Horror Story, retroactively subtitled Murder House, centers on the Harmon family, who, after dealing with a miscarriage and infidelity, move to a restored mansion in Los Angeles, unaware that the ghosts of its former residents and their victims haunt the house. The ensemble cast includes Connie Britton, Dylan McDermott, Evan Peters, Taissa Farmiga, Denis O'Hare, and Jessica Lange.

Created by Ryan Murphy and Brad Falchuk for cable network FX, American Horror Story was announced in February 2011, with production commencing that April. The season was broadcast between October 5 and December 21, 2011, being produced by 20th Century Fox Television. Dante Di Loreto served as executive producer alongside Murphy and Falchuk.

Murder House generally received positive reviews from critics and drew consistently high ratings for FX, ending its cycle as the biggest new cable series of the year. The season was nominated for various industry awards, including the Golden Globe Award for Best Television Series – Drama, and received a total of seventeen Emmy Award nominations. In addition, Lange won the Golden Globe, the Screen Actors Guild Award, and the Primetime Emmy Award for her supporting role.

Cast and characters

Main

 Connie Britton as Vivien Harmon
 Dylan McDermott as Dr. Ben Harmon
 Evan Peters as Tate Langdon
 Taissa Farmiga as Violet Harmon 
 Denis O'Hare as Larry Harvey 
 Jessica Lange as Constance Langdon

Special guest stars
 Kate Mara as Hayden McClaine
 Zachary Quinto as Chad Warwick
 Charles S. Dutton as Detective Granger
 Eric Stonestreet as Derek

Recurring
 Frances Conroy as Moira O'Hara
 Lily Rabe as Nora Montgomery
 Matt Ross as Dr. Charles Montgomery
 Alexandra Breckenridge as young Moira O'Hara
 Jamie Brewer as Adelaide "Addie" Langdon
 Morris Chestnut as Luke
 Christine Estabrook as Marcy
 Bodhi Schulz as Troy
 Kai Schulz as Bryan
 Celia Finkelstein as Nurse Gladys
 Michael Graziadei as Travis Wanderley
 Kyle Davis as Dallas
 Eve Gordon as Dr. Hall
 Rosa Salazar as Nurse Maria
 Teddy Sears as Patrick
 Azura Skye as Fiona
 David Anthony Higgins as Stan
 Sam Kinsey as Beauregard "Beau" Langdon
 Sarah Paulson as Billie Dean Howard
 Rebecca Wisocky as Lorraine Harvey
 Shelby Young as Leah

Guest stars
 Adina Porter as Sally Freeman
 Christian Serratos as Becca
 Bianca Lawson as Abby
 Eric Close as Hugo Langdon
 Jordan David as Kevin Gedman
 Malaya Rivera Drew as Detective Barrios
 Brando Eaton as Kyle Greenwell
 Alexander Nimetz as Amir Stanley
 Ashley Rickards as Chloe Stapleton
 Mena Suvari as Elizabeth Short
 Alessandra Torresani as Stephanie Boggs
 Ben Woolf as Thaddeus Montgomery / The Infantata

Episodes

Production

Conception

Creators Murphy and Falchuk began working on American Horror Story before their Fox series Glee began production. Murphy wanted to do the opposite of what he had done previously and thus began his work on the series. He stated, "I went from Nip/Tuck to Glee, so it made sense that I wanted to do something challenging and dark. And I always had loved, as Brad had, the horror genre. So it just was a natural for me." Falchuk was intrigued by the idea of putting a different angle on the horror genre, stating that their main goal in creating the series was to scare viewers. "You want people to be a little bit off balance afterward," he said.

The dark tone of the series is modeled after the ABC soap opera Dark Shadows, which Murphy's grandmother forced him to watch when he was younger to toughen him up. He also cited Rosemary's Baby, Don't Look Now, The Amityville Horror, and Stanley Kubrick's version of The Shining as influences for the series.

Murphy and Falchuk planned that each season of the series would tell a different story from the beginning. After the first-season finale aired, Murphy spoke of his plans to change the cast and location for the second season, while retaining some actors from the first, "The people that are coming back will be playing completely different characters, creatures, monsters, etc. [The Harmons'] stories are done."

In February 2011, FX officially announced that it had ordered a pilot for a possible series from Ryan Murphy and Brad Falchuk, with both Murphy and Falchuk writing and Murphy directing. Dante Di Loreto was announced as executive producer. Production on the series began in April 2011. In July 2011, FX officially announced the project had been given a series order consisting of 13 episodes. In August 2011, it was announced that Tim Minear, Jennifer Salt, James Wong, and Jessica Sharzer had joined the series as writers.

Crossover with Coven (AHS: Apocalypse)
On October 30, 2016, Murphy announced that a future crossover season of the series would continue the Murder House and Coven stories, merging their characters and themes. He did not state which season it would be but that he had already reached out to actors from both seasons to reprise their respective roles. Murphy later confirmed one of the Murder House characters would be moved in the season finale of Coven. However, on January 5, 2018, it was initially announced that the crossover season would be taking place in the ninth season. Still, on June 14, 2018, the crossover was moved to the eighth season, titled Apocalypse.

Casting
Casting announcements began in March 2011, with Connie Britton first to be cast, portraying female lead Vivien Harmon. Britton stated that she took a risk in taking the role of Vivien. When Murphy presented the role to her, he said, "This is something we've never seen you do before. It will be turning what you've just been doing on its ear." She was intrigued by what he had presented her and ultimately decided to take the part. In an interview with Entertainment Weekly, series co-creator Ryan Murphy stated that he had told Connie Britton, early on, that her character Vivien would die in the first season. "We've really had the whole season mapped out from the beginning," he said. "In the meetings with the core actors, the three leads being Connie, Dylan [McDermott] and Jessica [Lange], as we tried to snare them, we were able to say this is where you start, this is the middle, and this is where you end up. So, yes, I was able to tell Connie really the whole run of the series."

Denis O'Hare joined the cast in late March 2011 as Larry Harvey. Jessica Lange joined the cast in April 2011 as Constance, marking her first regular role on television. Lange was attracted to the role because it didn't require a 22-episode commitment like a series on a broadcast network. "That was huge for me!" she said. "I wasn't about to commit to, you know, six months. It was cable, rather than network... I've been offered network [shows] before, and determined not to do it, just because I can't make that kind of time commitment."

Dylan McDermott was cast as the lead Ben Harmon in late April 2011. His character was initially described as "a handsome and masculine but sensitive therapist who loves his family but has hurt his wife." McDermott stated that he wanted to do the role to break away from his previous role as Bobby Donnell in the ABC series The Practice. "This was exactly why I wanted to do this show – to change it up and do a different kind of character. People think of me as the guy from The Practice... I wanted to turn that [notion] on its head, and hopefully, I'm doing that [with this show]", he said.

In May 2011, Taissa Farmiga and Evan Peters were the last lead actors to be cast, portraying Violet Harmon and Tate Langdon, respectively. Farmiga said that she loved Violet "immediately" and that "she had spunk to her, she had attitude." Murphy has described Tate as the "true monster" of the series, adding, "To Evan's great credit and the credit of the writers, I think Evan's done an amazingly difficult job making a monster sympathetic."

Filming

The pilot episode was shot on location in a house in Country Club Park, Los Angeles, California, which serves as the haunted house and crime scene in the series. Designed and built in 1902 by Alfred Rosenheim, the president of the American Institute of Architects' Los Angeles chapter, the Tudor or Collegiate Gothic-style single-family home was previously used as a convent. An adjoining chapel was removed from exterior shots using CGI.

The series is filmed on sets that are an exact replica of the house. Details such as Louis Comfort Tiffany stained glass windows, and hammered bronze light fixtures, were re-created to preserve the look of the house. The house became available for rent on Airbnb for six months, beginning February 2016, before being unlisted.

Due to a "very aggressive" production schedule and the series' pilot shoot having to wait for co-creators Ryan Murphy and Brad Falchuk's other show, Glee, to wrap its second season production, it was announced that the show's first-season finale, the thirteenth episode, would be thirty minutes shorter than planned. Finally, the thirteenth episode was dropped and they made the twelfth episode 10 minutes longer (52 minutes). The finale aired on December 21, 2011.

Title sequence
The opening title sequence was created by Kyle Cooper and his company Prologue. He also created the title sequence for the AMC series The Walking Dead and the 1995 film Se7en. The theme music was composed by sound designer Cesar Davila-Irizarry and musician Charlie Clouser. The sequence is set in the Harmons' basement and includes images of postmortem young children, unborn (or aborted) babies in jars, skulls, a christening dress, a nurse's uniform, and a figure holding a pair of bloody hedge clippers. Murphy described the sequence as a mini-mystery and stated, "By the time you see the ninth episode of this season, every image in that title sequence will be explained."

Reception

Critical response
American Horror Story: Murder House received positive reviews from critics. Metacritic reported a weighted score of 65 out of 100 on  based on 164 reviews, indicating "generally favorable reviews." The review aggregation website Rotten Tomatoes reported a "Certified Fresh" 72% approval rating with an average rating of 6.55/10 based on 147 reviews. The website's consensus reads, "Convoluted yet effective, American Horror Story is strange, gory, and twisted enough to keep viewers hooked." Ken Tucker from Entertainment Weekly awarded the pilot episode a B+, stating, "AHS is pretty much all scare, all the time: a whole lotta screams, sex, jolts, mashed faces, psychotic behavior, and dead babies." Chuck Barney of the San Jose Mercury News said, "Most TV shows, after all, quickly fade from memory. This one will haunt your dreams." Hank Stuever from The Washington Post said in his review, "Overdoing things is one of Murphy's trademark flaws, but this show has a captivating style and giddy gross-outs." The New York Times Mike Hale called the show "a more classically minded chiller," taking into mind the success of HBO's True Blood and AMC's The Walking Dead. However, not all reviews were favorable. Alan Sepinwall of HitFix gave the series a D−, saying, "It is so far over the top that the top is a microscopic speck in its rearview mirror."

Awards and nominations

In its first season, American Horror Story was nominated for 65 awards and won 19.

* The FX network submitted the series to the Academy of Television Arts & Sciences in the miniseries, rather than the drama series, category for its 64th Primetime Emmy Awards.

Ratings

The pilot episode gained a 1.6 ratings share among adults aged 18–49 and garnered 3.2 million viewers, and totalled 5.2 million between two airings. These were the best numbers FX had ever received for a series premiere. Taken together with equally strong numbers for the station's returning original series – Sons of Anarchy, It's Always Sunny in Philadelphia and The League – the episode helped make October the most-watched month on FX ever. The episode was seen by 3.2 million viewers total in 59 countries.

Ratings increased as the season progressed, with the fourth episode receiving a 1.7 ratings share among adults 18–49, a tenth of a point higher than the pilot episode. The seventh episode had a viewership of 3.06 million, receiving a 1.8 ratings share in the 18–49 demographic; a series high. The season finale was watched by 3.22 million viewers and received a 1.7 ratings share in the 18–49 demographic. The first season tied with the TNT series Falling Skies as the biggest new cable series of the year among adults 18–49.

American Horror Story November 2011 international premiere across Europe and Latin America, on Fox International Channels, drew rankings of 1st or 2nd among all Pay-TV in most metered markets for its time slot. In the UK, it premiered on non-terrestrial channel FX, with 128,200 viewers. The second episode saw an increase of 27%, receiving an overall viewership of 158,700.

Home media

References

External links

 
 

American Horror Story (season 1)
2010s American LGBT-related drama television series
Abortion in fiction
Adultery in television
01
Fiction about the Devil
Down syndrome in television
Fictional depictions of the Antichrist
Ghosts in television
Mariticide in fiction
Mass murder in fiction
Television about mental health
Mythology in popular culture
Primetime Emmy Award-winning television series
Rape in television
Suicide in television
Television series about dysfunctional families
Television series set in the 1920s
Television series set in the 1940s
Television series set in the 1960s
Television series set in the 1980s
Television series set in the 1990s
Television series set in the 2010s
Television shows set in Boston
Television shows set in Los Angeles